Julen Amezqueta Moreno (born 12 August 1993 in Estella) is a Spanish cyclist, who currently rides for UCI ProTeam .

He was named in the start list for the 2016 Giro d'Italia. In October 2020, he was named in the startlist for the 2020 Vuelta a España.

Major results
2015
 1st  Overall Volta a Portugal do Futuro
1st  Points classification
1st Stage 2
2019
 6th Overall Rhône-Alpes Isère Tour
 7th Classica da Arrabida
2020
 1st  Mountains classification Settimana Internazionale di Coppi e Bartali
2021
 3rd Overall Vuelta a Andalucía
 6th Vuelta a Castilla y León
 7th Overall Route d'Occitanie
 10th Overall Vuelta Asturias
  Combativity award Stages 3, 9 & 12 Vuelta a España

Grand Tour general classification results timeline

References

External links

1993 births
Living people
Spanish male cyclists
Cyclists from Navarre
People from Estella Oriental